Jacques Caffieri (25 August 1678, Paris – 25 November 1755, Paris) was a French sculptor, working for the most part in bronze.

Life
Jacques Caffiéri was the fifth son of Philippe Caffieri (1634-1716), the founder of this family of artists. Jacques was received a maître fondeur-ciseleur by 1715, the date of his first known work, a design for a pall for the Corporation des Fondeurs-Ciseleurs, one of two  Parisian guilds that oversaw works cast in metal, from full-scale sculptures to gilt-bronze furniture mounts, wall-lights and candlesticks. As fondeurs-ciseleurs,  "casters and finishers", the renown of the Caffieri family has centred on Jacques, though later it is not easy to distinguish between Jacques' work and that of Jacques' son, the younger Philippe (1714–1777).

Caffieri was attached as fondeur-ciseleur to the Bâtiments du Roi in 1736. A large proportion of his brilliant achievement as a designer and chaser in bronze and other metals was executed for the crown at Versailles, Fontainebleau, Marly, Compiègne, Choisy and the Château de La Muette, and the crown, ever in his debt, still owed him money at his death.  Philippe and his son Jacques undoubtedly worked together in the Appartement du Dauphin at Versailles, and although much of their contribution has disappeared, the gilt-bronze decorations of the marble chimney-piece still remain. They belong to the best of full-blown Rococo style; vigorous and graceful in design, they are executed with splendid skill.

After the elder Philippe's death in 1716, Jacques continued to work for the crown, but had many private clients. From the Caffieri workshop in rue des Canettes came an amazing amount of work, chiefly in the shape of those gilt-bronze furniture mounts which adorned furniture by the best ébénistes of Paris.  Little of his achievement was ordinary; an astonishingly large proportion of it is famous. In the Wallace Collection, London, is the royal commode delivered by  Antoine-Robert Gaudreau, ébéniste du Roi, in 1739 for Louis XV's bedchamber at Versailles: it is richly mounted with an integrated series of corner mounts, chutes and sabots, and the drawer-fronts and a single composition into which the handles are fully integrated. It must have been the result of close cooperation between Caffiéri and  Gaudreau, who was responsible for the veneered carcase. In 1747 Caffiéri supplied gilt-bronze mounts for the marble chimneypiece in the Dauphin's bedroom at Versailles. Caffieri also produced gilt-bronze cases for clocks, both mantel clocks and the cartel clocks that combined clock and bracket in one unified design, to be mounted on a wall. A detailed inventory of the Caffieri workshop made in 1747 enables scholars to identify some unsigned clockcases from the workshop: a fully Rococo cartel clock with a movement by Julien Le Roy is at the Getty Museum: it is inscribed fait par Caffiery in a cartouche below the dial.

In 1740, Caffieri's wife purchased a royal privilege, which allowed the Caffieri workshop to gild bronze as well as cast it within the same workshop; ordinarily the processes were divided between two Parisian corporations, jealous of their jurisdictions, the fondeurs-ciseleurs and the ciseleurs-doreurs.

His signature incised in gilt-bronze kept his name alive in the nineteenth century and gained him an entry in Encyclopædia Britannica 1911, though the extreme Rococo style of which he was a consummate master laid his work open to disapproving commentary. Two monumental gilt-bronze chandeliers in the Wallace Collection, London, bear his signature; one of them was a wedding present from Louis XV to Louise-Elisabeth of France in 1739; the other is signed and dated 1751.  The famous astronomical clock made by C.-S. Passement and Dauthiau for Louis XV, 1749–1753, is housed in a Rococo case signed by Caffieri. Another clock, with a movement by Balthasar Martinot in an extreme Rococo style gilt-bronze case, belongs to the Duke of Buccleuch, at Boughton House A pair of fire-dogs signed and dated 1752 is in the Cleveland Museum of Art Two large gilt-bronze mirror-frames by Caffieri, to a design by Ange-Jacques Gabriel, were intended as a gift to the Sultan of Turkey; the price was an astonishing 24,982 livres.

He made a great cross and six candlesticks for the high altar of Notre Dame, which disappeared in the French Revolution, but similar work for Bayeux Cathedral still exists. A wonderful enamelled toilet set which he executed for the Princess of Asturias has also disappeared.

A few portrait busts by Jacques Caffieri exist, notably of the baron de Besenval (1737) and his son (1735) (Watson 1966).

Sons
Jacques Caffiéri was joined in the workshop by his son, the younger Philippe Caffiéri (1714–1774), who also was received as a maître fondeur-ciseleur and who sometimes signed his independent works, especially after the death of his father in 1755, P.CAFFIERI. The younger Philippe's style was gradually modified by the new taste for Neoclassicism. Like his father, he drew large sums from the crown, usually after giving many years credit, while many other years were needed by his heirs to get in the balance of the royal indebtedness.

Philippe's younger brother, Jean-Jacques Caffieri (1725–1792), was a sculptor, appointed sculpteur du Roi to Louis XV and later afforded lodgings in the Galeries du Louvre. He designed the fine rampe d'escalier which still adorns the Palais Royal. He is better known for his portrait busts, in terracotta or marble: his bust of Madame du Barry is at the Hermitage Museum, St Petersburg. He made a name with his busts of Pierre Corneille and Jean Racine for the foyer of the Comédie Française.

Notes

References

Francis J.B. Watson, The Wrightsman Collection (Metropolitan Museum of Art), 1966, vol. I, no. 217ab, vol. II pp 563f (biography of Jacques Caffiéri).
(Getty Museum) Jacques Caffiéri

18th-century French sculptors
French male sculptors
1678 births
1755 deaths
French people of Italian descent
18th-century French male artists